Natalya "Natasha" Stroeva (born 20 August 1999) is a Russian model and beauty pageant titleholder who placed as the second runner-up at Miss Russia 2018, representing Yakutia. She was later appointed Miss World Russia 2018, and represented Russia at Miss World 2018.

Early life
Stroeva was born in Yakutsk, Sakha Republic, and is an ethnic Yakut. She is an orphan; her mother abandoned the family shortly after Stroeva's birth, and her father died of cancer when she was 12 years old. Stroeva's older brother became her legal guardian after the death of their father. She resides in Moscow, where she is a student at the Russian National Research Medical University. Stroeva plans on becoming a dermatologist after graduating.

Pageantry
Stroeva began her pageantry career in January 2018 after being crowned Miss Yakutia 2017, which allowed her to compete in the Miss Russia 2018 competition. She went on to place as the second runner-up in the competition held in Moscow after qualifying to the top twenty through the fan vote, becoming the highest-placing entrant from Yakutia since Sardana Syromyatnikova placed as the second runner-up at Miss Russia 2006.

In September 2018, following the announcement of the dates of Miss Universe 2018 and Miss World 2018, it was confirmed by the Miss Russia contest management that Miss Russia 2018 winner Yulia Polyachikhina would only compete in Miss Universe, while Stroeva would represent Russia at Miss World in Sanya, China, where she made the top 30.

References

External links

1999 births
Living people
Miss World 2018 delegates
People from Yakutsk
Russian beauty pageant winners
Russian female models
Yakut people